

Carl Hilpert (12 September 1888 – 1 February 1947) was a German general during World War II.

Biography 
When World War II broke out in September 1939, Hilpert became chief of the staff of Armeeabteilung A on 9 September 1939 under the command of Kurt von Hammerstein-Equord, who was tasked with securing the western border with Belgium and the Netherlands. After its dissolution on 3 October, the staff was used to form the South Border Section Command in Kraków, where Hilpert remained active, before taking up the post of chief of staff of the 1st Army under Erwin von Witzleben on 5 February 1940. With this association, Hilpert took part in the Battle of France and after its successful completion on 1 October 1940, he was promoted to lieutenant general. Since Erwin von Witzleben, who had been appointed Generalfeldmarschall, now took over Army Group D (from April 1941 also Oberbefehlshaber West) in occupied France on 26 October 1940, Hilpert also succeeded him as the new Chief of Staff of the Army Group. Hilpert remained in this position for the next year and a half. After the daring British St Nazaire Raid revealed the poor state of western defences in March 1942, Hilpert was removed from this post and transferred to the Fuhrerreserve.

On 26 June 1942, Hilpert became acting commander of the LIX Army Corps and in July took over the command of XXIII Corps with which he fought against the Soviet Operation Mars. On 20 January 1943, he became Commanding General of LIV Corps, which was deployed under the 18th Army of Army Group North before Leningrad and was involved in heavy defensive battles during Operation Iskra. In the following summer 1943 too, he proved himself in further defensive battles in the Fifth Sinyavino Offensive, for which he was later awarded the Knight's Cross of the Iron Cross on 22 August 1943.

From 31 October 1943, he briefly commanded the XXVI Army Corps off Leningrad before taking over I Army Corps in the area of the 16th Army fighting in the Newel area on 1 January 1944. As part of the Soviet winter offensive (Leningrad–Novgorod Offensive), Hilpert's troops got into heavy fighting, and Hilpert himself fell out. In July 1944, during the battles that followed the start of the Soviet summer offensive Operation Bagration, Hilpert managed to break out of the Polotsk Fortress in heavy battles. For this achievement he received the oak leaves for the Knight's Cross on 8 August 1944.

During the last stages of World War II, Hilpert commanded the German troops which had been surrounded by the Red Army in the Courland Pocket. On 7 May 1945, Karl Dönitz, in his capacity as head of state, ordered Hilpert to surrender Army Group Courland. Hilpert was the army group's last commander-in-chief. Hilpert surrendered himself, his personal staff, and three divisions of the XXXVIII Corps to Soviet Marshal Leonid Govorov. Hilpert sent the following message to his troops:

 He was taken prisoner by the Soviets and later charged with war crimes. Found guilty and sentenced to death, he was executed in February 1947.

Command history 
 Acting General Officer Commanding - LIX Corps - 1942
 General Officer Commanding - XXIII Corps - 1942 to 1943
 General Officer Commanding - LIV Corps - 1943
 General Officer Commanding - XXVI Corps - 1943
 General Officer Commanding - I Army Corps - 1 January to 20 January 1944
 General Officer Commanding - I Army Corps - 1 May to 1 August 1944
 Acting General Officer Commanding - 16th Army, Eastern Front - 1944 to 1945
 Acting Commander-in-Chief - Army Group North, Eastern Front - 1945
 Acting Commander-in-Chief - Army Group Courland, Eastern Front - 1945
 General Officer Commanding - 16th Army, Eastern Front - 1945
 Commander-in-Chief - Army Group Courland, Eastern Front - 15 March to 8 May 1945
 Prisoner of war - 1945 to 1947

Awards and decorations
 Iron Cross (1914) 2nd Class (7 October 1914) & 1st Class (18 October 1916)
 Clasp to the Iron Cross (1939) 2nd Class (20 April 1940) & 1st Class (16 June 1940)
 German Cross in Gold on 19 February 1943 as General der Infanterie and commanding general of the XXIII Armeekorps
 Knight's Cross of the Iron Cross with Oak Leaves
 Knight's Cross on 22 August 1943 as General der Infanterie and commander of the LIV. Armeekorps
 Oaks Leaves on 8 August 1944 as General der Infanterie and commander of the I. Armeekorps

References

Citations

Bibliography

 
 
 

1888 births
1947 deaths
Colonel generals of the German Army (Wehrmacht)
People from the Kingdom of Bavaria
Military personnel from Nuremberg
German Army personnel of World War I
Recipients of the clasp to the Iron Cross, 1st class
Recipients of the Gold German Cross
Recipients of the Knight's Cross of the Iron Cross with Oak Leaves
German prisoners of war in World War II held by the Soviet Union
Nazis executed in the Soviet Union